The Washington Waldorf School is a private K-12 school in Bethesda, Maryland, just north of Washington, D.C., on a 6-acre campus the school rents from Montgomery County.

As a Waldorf school, the curriculum is based on the educational philosophy of Rudolf Steiner. Washington Waldorf School is one of over 1000 Waldorf schools worldwide and 150 Waldorf schools in North America.

The school has one of the few outdoor kindergarten programs in the Washington, D.C., area.

History
The Washington Waldorf School was founded initially as a grade school in 1969 in Washington, D.C., and in 1982 moved to its current six-acre campus in Bethesda, Maryland. The high school was added in 1984 and graduated its first 12th grade in 1988.

The school is accredited by Association of Independent Maryland and DC Schools and the Association of Waldorf Schools of North America. The school's sports teams (baseball, basketball, cross country, soccer, softball, and swimming) compete in the Potomac Valley Athletic Conference. The school mascot is the Red-Tailed Hawks.

See also
 Curriculum of the Waldorf schools

References

External links
 Official web site
 The Waldorf Method, The Washington Times, June 1, 2003. Accessed 2009-04-19.

Waldorf schools in the United States
Private K-12 schools in Montgomery County, Maryland
Schools in Bethesda, Maryland